The Forty Martyrs of England and Wales or Cuthbert Mayne and Thirty-Nine Companion Martyrs are a group of Catholic, lay and religious, men and women, executed between 1535 and 1679 for treason and related offences under various laws enacted by Parliament during the English Reformation. The individuals listed range from Carthusian monks who in 1535 declined to accept Henry VIII's Act of Supremacy, to seminary priests who were caught up in the alleged Popish Plot against Charles II in 1679. Many were sentenced to death at show trials, or with no trial at all.

Background
The first wave of executions came with the reign of King Henry VIII and involved persons who did not support the 1534 Act of Supremacy and dissolution of the monasteries. Carthusian John Houghton and Bridgettine Richard Reynolds died at this time.

In 1570 Pope Pius V, in support of various rebellions in England and Ireland, excommunicated Queen Elizabeth, absolving her Catholic subjects of their allegiance to her. The crown responded with more rigorous enforcement of various penal laws already enacted and passed new ones. 13 Eliz. c.1 made it high treason to affirm that the queen ought not to enjoy the Crown, or to declare her to be a heretic. "An act against Jesuits, seminary priests, and such other like disobedient persons", (27 Eliz.1, c. 2), the statute under which most of the English martyrs suffered, made it high treason for any Jesuit or any seminary priest to be in England at all, and a felony for any person to harbor or aid them. All but six of the forty had been hanged, drawn and quartered, many of them at Tyburn.

The martyrs

 Saint John Almond
 Saint Edmund Arrowsmith
 Saint Ambrose Barlow
 Saint John Boste
 Saint Alexander Briant
 Saint Edmund Campion
 Saint Margaret Clitherow
 Saint Philip Evans
 Saint Thomas Garnet
 Saint Edmund Gennings
 Saint Richard Gwyn
 Saint John Houghton
 Saint Philip Howard
 Saint John Jones
 Saint John Kemble
 Saint Luke Kirby
 Saint Robert Lawrence
 Saint David Lewis
 Saint Anne Line
 Saint John Lloyd
 Saint Cuthbert Mayne
 Saint Henry Morse
 Saint Nicholas Owen
 Saint John Payne
 Saint Polydore Plasden
 Saint John Plessington
 Saint Richard Reynolds
 Saint John Rigby
 Saint John Roberts
 Saint Alban Roe
 Saint Ralph Sherwin
 Saint Robert Southwell
 Saint John Southworth
 Saint John Stone
 Saint John Wall
 Saint Henry Walpole
 Saint Margaret Ward
 Saint Augustine Webster
 Saint Swithun Wells
 Saint Eustace White

Canonization process
Following beatifications between 1886 and 1929, there were already numerous martyrs from England and Wales recognised with the rank of Blessed. The bishops of the province identified a list of 40 further names; reasons given for the choice of those particular names include a spread of social status, religious rank, geographical spread and the pre-existence of popular devotion. The list of names was submitted to Rome in December 1960. In the case of a martyr, a miracle is not required. For a martyr, the Pope has only to make a declaration of martyrdom, which is a certification that the Venerable died voluntarily as a witness of the Faith or in an act of heroic charity for others.

The Archbishop of Westminster, then Cardinal William Godfrey, sent a description of 24 seemingly miraculous cases to the Sacred Congregation. Out of 20 candidate cases for recognition as answered prayers, the alleged cure of a young mother from a malignant tumor was selected as the clearest case. In light of the fact that Thomas More and John Fisher, belonging to the same group of Martyrs, had been canonized with a dispensation from miracles, Pope Paul VI, after discussions with the Sacred Congregation for the Causes of Saints, considered that it was possible to proceed with the Canonization on the basis of one miracle.

Pope Paul VI granted permission for the whole group of 40 names to be recognised as saints on the strength of this one miracle. The canonization ceremony took place in Rome on 25 October 1970.

Liturgical feast day
In England, these martyrs were formerly commemorated within the Catholic Church by a feast day on 25 October, which is also the feast of Saints Crispin and Crispinian, but they are now celebrated together with all the 284 canonized or beatified martyrs of the English Reformation on 4 May.

In Wales, the Catholic Church keeps 25 October as the feast of the Six Welsh Martyrs and their companions. The Welsh Martyrs are the priests Philip Evans and John Lloyd, John Jones, David Lewis, John Roberts, and the teacher Richard Gwyn. The companions are the 34 English Martyrs listed above. Wales continues to keep 4 May as a separate feast for the beatified martyrs of England and Wales.

See also
Saint Thomas More
Saint John Fisher
List of Catholic martyrs of the English Reformation
English Saints and Martyrs of the Reformation Era, a Church of England commemoration-day for all martyrs of the English Reformation era
Catholic Church in England and Wales
Eighty-five martyrs of England and Wales, a list of eighty-five beatified by the Pope to represent those executed during the English Reformation
Carthusian Martyrs of London
Irish Catholic Martyrs

References

External links
 Catholic Forum: Forty Martyrs of England and Wales
 Sermon of Paul VI on the occasion of the canonization of forty martyrs from England and Wales, 25 October 1970 (largely in Italian)
 Molinari, Paolo, S.J., "Canonization of 40 English and Welsh Martyrs", L'Osservatore Romano, 29 October 1970 
 Cuthbert Mayne and 39 Companions: Martyrs of England and Wales

 
Canonizations by Pope Paul VI
16th-century Christian saints
17th-century Christian saints
English Roman Catholic saints
History of Catholicism in England
Lists of Christian martyrs
Lists of saints
Catholic Church in England
Catholic Church in England and Wales
Recusants
Welsh Roman Catholic saints
1535 deaths
Groups of Christian martyrs of the Early Modern era
Groups of Roman Catholic saints